Philip Andrew Horne (born 21 January 1960) is a former New Zealand cricketer who played in 4 Tests and 4 ODIs from 1987 to 1990. He also represented New Zealand in badminton at the 1986 Commonwealth Games.

Horne was born in Upper Hutt on 21 January 1960, the son of Noelene Rae Horne (née Swinton), who represented New Zealand in the high jump, and Valentine Arthur Horne, who managed the New Zealand badminton team at the 1966 British Empire and Commonwealth Games. His younger brother Matt also played international cricket for New Zealand.

References 

1960 births
Living people
Sportspeople from Upper Hutt
New Zealand Test cricketers
New Zealand One Day International cricketers
New Zealand cricketers
Auckland cricketers
Cricketers at the 1987 Cricket World Cup
New Zealand male badminton players
Badminton players at the 1986 Commonwealth Games
Commonwealth Games competitors for New Zealand